Autoroute 955 is a short  two-lane highway which links Autoroute 20 in Sainte-Eulalie with Saint-Albert.
 
This short section of Autoroute was destined to become part of a much longer section of freeway, as Autoroute 55 was supposed to follow this route south towards Warwick and Richmond, as opposed to its current configuration through Drummondville; however, this was never completed, but the short route still remains. The route has a posted speed limit of  despite at-grade four-way stop intersections such as Route 122.

Its current northern interchange with Autoroute 20 also connects it to parent route Autoroute 55, which was extended south to A-20 in October 2006.

Hydro-Québec's HVDC Quebec - New England Transmission circuit runs parallel alongside A-955 through most of the road's length.

Major intersections

References

External links

A-955 at motorways-exits.com
A-955 at Quebec Autoroutes
Transports Quebec Map 

55-9
Roads in Centre-du-Québec